Too Wet to Plow is a studio album by the American blues musician Johnny Shines, released in 1977.

Production
The album was recorded in Edmonton and was produced by Holger Petersen.

Critical reception

Greil Marcus, in Rolling Stone, called the album "an unelectrified, completely personal statement that speaks as well for the cutting power of country blues in the late Seventies as Muddy Waters’s Hard Again did for that of Chicago blues."

AllMusic wrote that the album "finds Shines in excellent form ... one of the album's high points is an interpretation of Robert Johnson's 'Hot Tamale'." Reviewing a reissue, The Milwaukee Journal praised the "superb" slide guitar, writing that "the country blues here sound great."

Track listing

Personnel
Johnny Shines - vocals, guitar
Sugar Blue - harmonica
Louisiana Red - guitar, harmonica

References

1977 albums